The following is a list of Italian artists nominated for MTV Europe Music Awards. List does not include MTV Europe Music Award for Best Italian Act, New Sounds of Europe or MTV Europe Music Award for Best European Act.

MTV Europe Music Awards
Artists nominated for MTV Europe Music Awards